Punnapuzha River is one of the tributaries of the  Chaliyar River. Chaliyar River is the fourth longest river in Kerala, south India at 169 km in length.

See also
Chaliyar River - Main river

Rivers of Malappuram district